St. Declan's College is an all-boys, Catholic secondary school located in Cabra West, Dublin, Ireland. It was originally established by The Christian Brothers in 1960 with an initial enrollment of 75.  It is now a public (state-funded) school under the management of the Edmund Rice Schools Trust.

Notable alumni

Sportspeople (footballers)
 The Brogan family:  Bernard Brogan Snr; Jim Brogan; Alan Brogan, born 1982; Bernard Brogan Jnr, born 1984
 Harry Kenny, born 1962
 Owen Heary, born 1976
 Richie Partridge, born 1980
 Barry Cahill, born 1981
 Paul Keegan, born 1984
 Shane Supple, born 1987
 Kevin Bonner
 Senan Connell
 Declan Lally
 Kevin Nolan
 Seán Bugler

Sportspeople (other) 
 Alan Nolan, hurler born 1985
 Peadar Carton, hurler and footballer born 1986

Artists
 Barry Ward (actor), stage and screen actor
 Gavin James (singer), singer-songwriter and musician.
 Kojaque (hip-hop artist), rapper and producer.

Politicians
 Paschal Donohoe, born 1974

Broadcasters
 Gareth O'Callaghan, born 1961

References

See also 
 Education in the Republic of Ireland

Educational institutions established in 1960
Secondary schools in Dublin (city)
1960 establishments in Ireland